Bass Odyssey is a Jamaican reggae and dancehall sound system founded in 1989 by Keith Walford.

History

Founded in Alexandria, St.Ann, in rural Jamaica, hence the famed tagline "from way out in the country", Bass Odyssey is one of the few sound systems that maintains the authentic sound system format with huge amplified portable speakers, stacked as columns for a live performance. Founder and owner Keith Walford was involved with music from an early age. After graduating from York Castle High in 1976, young Keith who joined his father's local mechanic business, partnered with him to expand it by adding the service of being a vendor and operator of jukeboxes and gaming machines across the island. As both a hobby and small business gig, young Keith would play vinyl and cassettes on his massive component set at small events such as weddings and birthday parties. Simultaneous with his increasing demand was the re-emergence of the sound system era in the Jamaican entertainment scene in the mid-1980s which inspired his path to establish the Bass Odyssey Sound System in 1989. For this reason, many dispute the established date of Bass Odyssey Sound System as 1989 due to the earlier career of Keith as a Dj and selector himself playing at numerous local gigs. Initially the transition involved Walford, close friend at the time Bunny Hayles, Winston and first official selector Tenor One.

Rise of the Clashing Twins: Squingy and Glamma G

Bass Odyssey quickly became a household name due to their notorious clashing style which dominated the peak of the modern soundclash era in the early - mid 1990s. Keith transitioned from being a selector and MC and turned over those duties to Tinna-One who was later joined by Glamma G. Around 1991, Kevin Squingy Bennett, fresh out of Ferncourt High joined the team as a drum machine player. Tinna-One took up opportunity and migrated to England and Glamma G and Squingy quickly rose to stardom as 'the juggling/clashing twins' due to the slight physical resemblance and unmatched energy. Around this time (early 1990s) the Bass Odyssey name had taken flight and had garnered a huge following in the Jamaican diaspora in USA, Canada and the UK. With frequent tour dates the team expanded to include Lenny, a longtime sidekick of Glamma G (both had worked together on Amplex Sound System from Spanish Town) and later Dwayne, Worm and Skinny.

Bass Odyssey in the 90s

As brand grew, so the crew. Some team members such as Hayles, Winston as well as Glamma G and Lenny went on to pursue other businesses and/or musical ventures.  Walford maintained the sound system and built upon it to surpass its past glory giving rise the legendary Squingy, Worm, DJ Mark and others who would become the new face of the now commercialized clash arena in the early to mid 2000s.

"Kevin Squingy Bennett"

Selector Squingy (real name Kevin Bennett) coined himself the "Michael Jordon" of Soundclash and is still referred to as such by clash fans around the world. Sadly in the late 2000s, Bennett fell ill with a terminal illness and passed in November 2009 at the age of 37.

Bass Odyssey Now

Bass Odyssey has evolved from an image notorious for clashing to also include become Jamaican musical ambassador. 
In 2011, Dj Mark went on to pursue other career paths after a colourful foundation with Bass Odyssey and passed the baton on to an energetic young team, quite a few of whom worked as protoje's under the influence of Squingy up until his death in 2009. Damien Delingy has assumed a leadership role on the sound, as had Worm after Mr. Bennett's passing. Country Speng has also been handling some of their top-line events in Jamaica and abroad.

Bass Odyssey Sound System Festival
To celebrate its 25th anniversary celebrations, the sound system hosted Jamaica's first ever sound system festival on 8 August 2014 in Richmond, St. Ann. The annal dance has been converted into a landmark event to salute the contribution of sound system to Jamaican culture and highlight an arena that has been overlooked and needs legislative help to survive.

Special Performances 
World Clash 2012 Jamaica 
David Rodigans birthday bash in 2003 and the Riddim Clash 2006, a yearly sound clash sponsored by the German reggae magazine Riddim.

Bass Odyssey have won the 2006, 2007, 2008, 2014 UK Cup Clash Soundclash (it was not held from 2009 to 2013) the New York World Clash Jamaica World Clash 2005 & 2012 2007,). Most recent clash wins include Guinness Sounds of Greatness 2010  and UK Tag Team Cup Clash 2010 alongside David Rodigan and One Love both sound systems out of Europe. In 2011, Keith Walford got elected to the Parliament of Jamaica, representing the St. Ann district for the People's National Party.

References

Jamaican sound systems
Jamaican dancehall musicians